Vanhojapoikia viiksekkäitä ("Moustached Bachelors") is a Finnish song composed and performed in by Juha Vainio. Released as a single in 1982 and the opening track to his 1983 album Sellaista elämä on, and remains one of his most popular songs to this day.

The song's lyrics tell the sad life stories of Nestori Miikkulainen, an old bachelor living on a rocky island in Lake Saimaa, and a lonely seal who lives in the waters near Nestori's cabin and comes to visit him when the old man plays his harmonica. The song's central themes are the depopulation of rural Finland, and nature preservation: the two protagonists are both said to be members of an endangered species.

References

1982 singles
1982 songs
Finnish songs
Songs with lyrics by Juha Vainio